Polygamy czar is an informal title given to the "Investigator of Crimes within Closed Societies" for the Utah Attorney General's Office. The position was established by the Utah State Legislature in 2000. The office is responsible for investigating tax evasion, welfare fraud, child abuse, sex abuse, domestic violence and other crimes committed within Fundamentalist Mormon communities that practice plural marriage. Ron Barton, Utah's first polygamy czar, contributed to the prosecutions of polygamists Rodney Holm and Tom Green on child rape and bigamy charges.

A fictionalized czar was introduced in the HBO series Big Love in the episode "Affair."

Officeholders
 Ron Barton (2000–2004)
 Jim Hill (2004–2006)

Notes

References
 

Government of Utah
Mormon fundamentalism
Mormonism and polygamy
Latter Day Saint movement in Utah